Unisan may refer to:

 Unisan, Quezon
 Unisan Island, Guimaras, Philippines